Cryptolechia citrodeta is a moth in the family Depressariidae. It was described by Edward Meyrick in 1921. It is found in Brazil.

The wingspan is 12–13 mm. The forewings are violet-grey with a whitish-yellow costal streak throughout and an irregular terminal line. The hindwings are grey.

References

Moths described in 1921
Cryptolechia (moth)
Taxa named by Edward Meyrick